Lisa Lou Banes (July 9, 1955 – June 14, 2021) was an American actress known for more than 80 film and television roles, as well as stage appearances on Broadway and elsewhere. 

Banes won a 1981 Theatre World Award for her performance as Alison Porter Off-Broadway in Look Back in Anger and, in 1984, was nominated for a Drama Desk Award for Best Featured Actress in a Play for Isn't it Romantic?. She played Lady Croom in the 1995 American premiere of Tom Stoppard's play Arcadia. In film, she appeared in Cocktail (1988), Freedom Writers (2007), Gone Girl (2014), and as Hollis in A Cure for Wellness (2016).

Early life
Banes was born in Chagrin Falls, Ohio. She studied acting at the Juilliard School in New York City.

Career

Stage
Banes appeared on Broadway several times. She played Cassie in the Neil Simon play Rumors in 1988 with Christine Baranski, Margaret Lord in the musical High Society with Anna Kendrick in 1998, was in Accent on Youth with David Hyde Pierce in 2009, and most recently in the 2010 revival of Present Laughter with Victor Garber.

Television and film
On television, Banes had regular roles as Doreen Morrison in The Trials of Rosie O'Neill starring Sharon Gless, and as Mayor Anita Massengil on the Fox comedy series Son of the Beach (2000–01). She also had recurring roles on The King of Queens as Carrie's boss Georgia Boone, Six Feet Under as Victoria, on One Life to Live as Eve McBain, and on Nashville Season 6 as the Ranch Director. She also guest starred as a Trill doctor in the Star Trek: Deep Space Nine episode "Equilibrium". Banes played Anne Kane in the 1985 TV miniseries Kane & Abel. Her other television credits include China Beach; Murder, She Wrote; The Practice; NYPD Blue; Desperate Housewives; Law & Order: Special Victims Unit; The Good Wife; NCIS; and Once Upon a Time. From 2010 to 2016, she had a recurring role as Ellen Collins on Royal Pains.

Banes also starred as Mrs. Berry in The Hotel New Hampshire (1984), Bonnie in Cocktail (1988), Flora in Dragonfly (2002), and Christina Ricci's mother in Pumpkin (2002). In 2014, she appeared in David Fincher's Gone Girl as Marybeth Elliott, mother of Amy Elliott (Rosamund Pike).

Personal life and death
Banes lived in Los Angeles. She was married to Kathryn Kranhold.

Death
On June 4, 2021, Banes, while in a crosswalk, was struck by a person operating an electric scooter. The scooter rider, who had gone through a red light, fled the scene of the hit and run collision on the Upper West Side of Manhattan. Prior to the crash, Banes was crossing the street to go to the Juilliard School. She was admitted to Mount Sinai Morningside Hospital with a traumatic brain injury  and died there on June 14 at the age of 65. The suspect later drove to an Upper Manhattan shop to get his vehicle fixed.

On August 5, 2021, police arrested 26-year old Brian Boyd at his apartment. He was jailed on a bail of $30,000 cash or $100,000 bond. He was charged with leaving the scene of an accident resulting in death, and failure to yield to a pedestrian. On September 28, 2022, Boyd pled guilty to manslaughter and was scheduled to be sentenced on November 30, 2022. Boyd was sentenced to up to three years in prison.

Filmography

Film

Television

References

External links

 

Lisa Banes New York Times obituary

1955 births
2021 deaths
People from Chagrin Falls, Ohio
Actresses from Ohio
American film actresses
American television actresses
American stage actresses
LGBT actresses
LGBT people from Ohio
Road incident deaths in New York City
Pedestrian road incident deaths
Juilliard School alumni
20th-century American actresses
21st-century American actresses